Alberto Rey  (born 7 August 1960 in Havana, Cuba) is a Cuban-American painter, illustrator, filmmaker, educator and writer. His work has been featured in over 200 exhibitions and screenings and has been included in the permanent collections of twenty museums including Albright-Knox Art Gallery, the Bronx Museum of the Arts, the Brooklyn Museum, the Burchfield Penney Art Center, El Museo del Barrio, Extremaduran and Latin American Museum of Contemporary Art, Museum of Art Fort Lauderdale, Museum of Latin American Art, and the Peabody Essex Museum. Rey is currently a distinguished professor at the State University of New York at Fredonia and in 2012 was inducted into the Burchfield Penney Art Center's Living Legacy Project. He has written several books corresponding to series of his work: Candaway Creek - Western New York (2021), Lost Beauty: Icebergs (2021), Lost Beauty: Part II - The Art of Museum Stories (2021), Extinct Birds Project (2018), and Complexities of Water - Biological Regionalism: Bagmati River, Kathmandu Valley, Nepal (2016) about the holiest and most polluted river Bagmati River in Kathmandu, Nepal. He has also had many articles and illustrations published in several magazines including the Buffalo Spree, Gray’s Sporting Journal, Art of Angling Journal, Fish and Fly Magazine, American Angler, and Saltwater Fisherman. Art historians and curators have also written one book and several essays about his work. Rey was selected as an international finalist for the 2020 Orvis Freshwater Guide of the Year and the winner of the 2021 Orvis Fly Fishing Guide of the Year.

Life
Born into a self-identifying community of Cubans with Spanish heritage known as criollos, Rey's family held numerous jobs while living in the small rural community of Agramonte, Cuba including farming, manufacturing, and running small businesses. Rey's father, who held a PhD in Mathematics from the University of Havana, would later become an instructor of Spanish after the family relocated to the United States.

At the age of three years old in 1963, Rey's parents brought him and his sister to Mexico through political asylum, then two years later relocated to Miami, FL. In 1965, his family moved north to the small coal-mining town of Barnesboro, PA (now called Northern Cambria) where he later graduated in 1982 with a Bachelor of Fine Arts degree specializing in drawing and painting from the Indiana University of Pennsylvania with accreditation from the Art Institute of Pittsburgh. In 2008, he received a Distinguished Alumni Award from the university.

Career
After finishing his undergraduate education, Rey briefly lived in Boston, MA, before returning to Miami, FL to work on Christo and Jeanne-Claude's Surrounded Islands Project in 1982. After working at the Joan of Arts Studio in Hollywood, FL, Rey pursued graduate studies north at the University of Buffalo and received his Master of Fine Arts Degree specializing in drawing and painting in 1987 (Bosch 2014, 15-16), and began traveling including the countries Spain, Italy, Morocco, Mexico, Caribbean, Iceland, Portugal, England, Wales, Cuba, Italy, Belgium, Canada, Nepal, and New Zealand, heightening an appreciation for the connections between different cultures and their relationship to their environment. Since 1982, Rey's Cuban heritage and immigration to America have played a role in developing his themes of bicultural identity and existence in complex environments. His abstract period of work from 1982 to 1992 involved layering Cuban iconography with his American experiences, symbolizing the struggles of fleeting memories and the romanticization of one's culture. The same year, The Burchfield-Penney Art Center inducted his work “Holy Angels Church and Chair” (1987; mixed media on canvas mounted on board, 96 x 56 inches) into their permanent collection. Rey spent the following year teaching at northeastern high schools and colleges including Lincoln-Sudbury High School, the Art Institute of Boston, New England School of Art and Design, and the Museum of Fine Arts. In 1988, Rey supplemented his education by taking courses in both contemporary art and environmental studies at Harvard University, Cambridge, MA. Soon after, Rey's work was inducted into El Museo del Barrio’s (New York City, NY) permanent collection, and he had his first solo NYC show at the Museum of Contemporary Hispanic Art (MoCHA).

Rey relocated to Fredonia, NY in 1989 to become a professor at the State University of New York at Fredonia (SUNY Fredonia), where he still teaches drawing and painting courses to this day. Later in 1989, Rey married Janeil Strong of Gloucester, MA. In 1991, the Burchfield-Penney Arts Center collected a second painting by Rey entitled “Binary Forms: Floating Between.” By 1992, Rey had works collected by several major museums including the Brooklyn Museum of Art (“Las Palmas Son Novias Que Esperan (The Palms Are Lovers Who Wait)”), the Bronx Museum of Art, and the Albright-Knox Art Gallery (“Binary Forms: XXI” and “Post-nuptial Gold: Time”). From 1992-1999 his work became more representational as he investigated his Cuban culture, its religion, food, politics, and relationship to American society.  

Rey became a curator and director for the Chautauqua Institution’s Center of the Visual Arts in 1996. Later he became a councilor on the Artist’s Advisory Panel of the New York Foundation for the Arts.

In 1998, Rey returned to Cuba for the first time since his emigration as a child and later created his first film, "Seeing in the Dark,"a black and white 16mm film about this trip. Rey founded the SAREP (Sport-fishing and Aquatic Resource Educational Programming) Youth Fly Fishing Program which provides children with environmental conservation information and is still the director to this day, though the program is now called Children in the Stream Youth Fly Fishing Program / 4H.

Post-1999, an increased interest in art history, ecology, and environmental conservation led Rey to incorporate more environmental realism into his work, as with his series "Biological Regionalism" exhibited in 2014 at the Burchfield-Penney Art Center. From 2000 to the present day, his work has explored the history of angling art, environmentalism, urban migration, and biology.

In 2006, Rey founded the annual stream clean-up program called the Canadaway Creek Conservation Project and founded the Brook Trout Restoration Project which teaches children how to introduce brook trout into local waterways. The former project, CCCP, consisted of volunteers removing invasive species, planting native tree species, and removing waste from local waterways in Western New York. The latter project brings low-middle income area children on monthly fishing trips and has helped brook trout numbers make a resurgence in population.

In 2007, The SUNY board of trustees awarded him with the university's highest honor as a SUNY Distinguished Professor for Research and Creativity.

In 2012, Rey was inducted into the Burchfield-Penney Arts Center Living Legacy Artist. 

In 2014, The first book about Rey's work Life Streams: Alberto Rey's Cuban and American Art was written by art historians Lynette M.F. Bosch and Mark Denaci.

In 2016, Rey wrote and illustrated a book about his project in Kathmandu, Nepal called Complexities of Water: Biological Regionalism: Bagmati River, Kathmandu Valley, Nepal with SUNY Fredonia colleague and graphic designer, Jason Dilworth. The project's exhibition opened at the Siddhartha Art Gallery at Barbar Mahal Revisited in Kathmandu, Nepal, Nov. 20, featuring fourteen paintings, water samples, the documentary "BAGMATI" and artwork by Nepalese artists. The project consisted of collecting scientific data about water quality, pollution, human impact, climate change, and plans to improve the health of the Bagmati river and inform neighboring communities about conservation methods. The project's goal was to present information, in an accessible manner, to explain how the holiest river in a country became a health threat and how to provide the residents of Kathmandu and other similar communities safer practices and choices in supplying water for their families.

In 2018, Alberto finished his next major project and published his second book Extinct Birds Project detailing the history and extinction of seventeen extinct bird species from around the world, the specimens of which are preserved at the Roger Tory Institute of Natural History in Jamestown, NY and the Museum of Comparative Zoology at Harvard University in Boston, MA. The initial exhibition opened at the Roger Tory Institute in August 2018, featuring 18 paintings of the extinct birds along with rare audio and video recordings provided by the institute. An overview of the exhibition was provided in an installation video. In 2019, Rey collaborated with the Anderson Gallery and the Buffalo Museum of Science to create the “Lost Beauty Series.” The first part of the exhibit opened at Anderson Gallery at the University of Buffalo in 2019 which included more rare audio and video recordings provided by the Macaulay Library at the Cornell Lab of Ornithology. The second part of the site-specific exhibition opened with new paintings at the Buffalo Museum of Science in the fall of 2021 large-scale paintings of 15 featuring artifacts and specimens from the museum's collection.

Works

Reverse Chronology of Painting Series 
Critical Endangered Palms of Cuba (2021-2022)

Inspired by Paul Craft's catalog "The Palms of Cuba," Rey's latest body of work explores endangered palm species threatened by soil erosion, agricultural development, and natural disasters. This series features ceramic work illustrating palm species and a map icon of where the species is located in the country. This series is an extension of Rey's interest in conservation-oriented art and further investigates aspects of his home country of Cuba.

Canadaway Creek - Western New York

In 2021, Rey released the book Canadaway Creek - Western New York, a collaborative effort by community members, faculty, and students from SUNY Fredonia where Rey is a distinguished professor. The book, which surveys the history, flora, fauna, and environmental impact of Canadaway Creek, was made possible by the Costello Interplay Award for Science and the Arts, a grant that supports the intersection between visual art and natural science. The project's goal was to provide a deep understanding of the Creek's impact as well as foster a sense of stewardship for the local environment.

Lost Beauty Project Series (2019-Present)

Lost Beauty: Icebergs

Spurred by Rey's second trip to Iceland in 2003, Icebergs is a series documenting the changing landscape of Jökulsárlón nearby the Arctic Circle, which is at risk of losing landmass due to climate change. In 2021, Rey published a book featuring drawings, paintings, and photos from the trips, as well as his historical research of the area.  One of his paintings entitled "Lost Beauty: Icebergs XVI" depicting the Breiđamerkurjökull glacier was displayed in the mini-retrospective exhibition "Life Streams: Alberto Rey, Cuban-American Artist" assembled by the Burchfield Penney Art Center at the Ogunquit Museum of American Art in Maine from July - October, 2021. This exhibition included large-scale paintings of fish caught in their native environments as well as works from Rey's previous series like Las Balsas. 

Lost Beauty: Part II - The Art of The Museum Stories

Rey is the first ever artist commissioned by the Buffalo Museum of Science to create a site-specific exhibition. Part II was presented in the fall of 2021 at the Buffalo Museum of Science featuring artifacts and specimens from the museum's collection of over 750,000 objects and artifacts, many of which have never been seen by the public. Displayed alongside the selected 15 small artifacts were Rey's large-scale paintings, some as large as six feet tall, depicting each item. Also featured were narrative descriptions about the items, as well as photos and time-lapse videos of the process in creating these paintings. The artifacts' histories and the project process was further detailed in Rey's accompanying book with the same title as the exhibition.Lost Beauty: Part I

In collaboration with the Buffalo Museum of Science, this project was presented at the Anderson Gallery at the University of Buffalo in the fall of 2019. Part I of the exhibition featured Rey's paintings and ceramics, audio files videos, and specimens from Rey's Extinct Birds Project, documenting the history and extinction of 18 extinct bird species.

Extinct Birds Project Series (2016-2019)

In 2018, Alberto published his second book Extinct Birds Project detailing the lives and history of seventeen extinct bird species from around the world, the specimens of which are preserved at the Roger Tory Institute of Natural History in Jamestown, NY and the Museum of Comparative Zoology at Harvard University in Boston, MA. The initial exhibition opened at the Roger Tory Institute in August 2018, featuring 18 paintings of the extinct birds along with rare audio and video recordings provided by the institute. An overview of the exhibition was provided in an installation video. In 2019, Rey collaborated with the Anderson gallery and the Buffalo Museum of Science to create the “Lost Beauty Series.” The first part of the exhibit opened at Anderson Gallery at the University of Buffalo in 2019 which included more rare audio and video recordings provided by the Macaulay Library at the Cornell Lab of Ornithology. The second part of the site-specific exhibition opened in the fall of 2021with new paintings at the Buffalo Museum of Science featuring artifacts and specimens from the museum's collection.

Biological Regionalism Series (2005-present)
Bioregionalism is a field studying an environment's natural flora and fauna, related geographic information, and connected biological areas in order to establish native from non-native species and how to effectively conserve and protect biodiversity. The Biological Regionalism Series began as a way to connect people to their local environments using imagery of native fish species, landscapes, and waterscapes in various media including painting, sculpture, installation, scientific data, and video recordings. Influenced by the 19th-century landscape and fauna painters like Winslow Homer and John James Audubon who depicted wilderness in art as something not only to be marveled at, but to be studied, documented, and understood. Rey's work in this series includes naturalistic depictions of fish swimming in their environments some of which are waterways polluted by man's increased commercially-driven enterprises. Combining the artwork with his own field notes and research, Rey's work invites viewers to reestablish a connection to nature, or discover natural phenomena in their own backyards of which they were previously unaware. According to art historian and art history professor Lynette M. F. Bosch, the series dissects themes of high and low art, the idea of a “highly-civilized” modern world, the intricate history of the site-specific projects, environmentalism, and how such imagery raises questions about humanity's right to exert influence over nature. (“Biological Regionalism: Scajaquada Creek, Erie County, New York, USA” exhibited at the Burchfield Penney Art Center March 14-June 22, 2014.The installation included paintings, videos, drawings, data, historical records, and water samples from the Scajaquada Creek exploring the lost relationship between communities and their surrounding environment.

“Biological Regionalism: Ellicott Creek, Amherst, New York, USA, 2010” 
This was exhibited at the University of Buffalo Art Gallery with maps of the waterways as it related to major landmarks including the university itself and the Buffalo-Niagara Airport and a video installation showing underwater film of native bass species and their environment.

The most recent iteration of this project is "Biological Regionalism: Oswego River and Lake Ontario, Central New York, USA", a series documenting species of threatened plants, the conditions of the Oswego River, and the impact of human settlements on the local waterways and environment. The site-specific project is in its research phase with the paintings, data collection, catalog, and video projections scheduled to exhibit at the Tyler Art Gallery at SUNY Oswego in spring 2022.

Bagmati River Art Project Series (2014-2016)

In 2016, Rey wrote and illustrated a book about his project in Kathmandu, Nepal called Complexities of Water: Biological Regionalism: Bagmati River, Kathmandu Valley, Nepal with SUNY Fredonia colleague and graphic designer, Jason Dilworth. The project exhibition opened at the Siddhartha Art Gallery at Barbar Mahal Revisited in Kathmandu, Nepal, Nov. 20, featuring fourteen paintings, water samples, the documentary "BAGMATI" and artwork by Nepalese artists. The project consisted of collecting scientific data about water quality, pollution, human impact, climate change, and plans to improve the health of the Bagmati river and inform neighboring communities about conservation methods. The project's stated goal was to present information in an accessible manner to explain how the holiest river in a country became a health threat and how to provide the residents of Kathmandu and other similar communities safer practices and choices in supplying water for their families.

The Aesthetics of Death Series (2006-2016)

Moved by the passing of his sister, Mayda, and his father-in-law, Neil Strong, Rey's series confronted death directly by depicting sick, dying, and deceased steelhead fish.  The paintings themselves used bright colors and gestural brushwork to contrast the starkness of death with the temporary brilliance of life. The viewers look down at the fish from above against a flat, muted background, highlighting the overall shape of the subject.The large scale of the paintings combined with the seeming unimportance of a dead fish (as its life likely had not barred any significance to the viewer, and at first perhaps neither would its death), turns the fish into monuments, capturing an unrepeatable moment for future study, appreciation, and contemplation.

Trout Encounters Series (2000-2004)

Returning to the United States after visiting Cuba in 1998 for the first time in over 30 years signaled a thematic change for Rey, creating work that investigated other aspects of his identity besides his Cuban heritage like exploring his passion for environmental conservation and researching art history. Akin to the Hudson River School artists who presented the general public with sweeping landscapes and depictions of wilderness, Rey's Trout Encounters brought together two worlds: the underwater world of regionally-specific trout species and the increasingly urbanized communities of people disconnected from their surroundings.

Studio Retablos Series (1998-2000)

This series combines several disciplines including the art history of America, Italy, Mexico, and Spain, as well as biology, pop culture, postmodernism, and politics. As he traveled for the previous 25 years collecting imagery and discarded paintings by amateur artists, Rey wanted to give these abandoned works new life. The old paintings were this series revitalized the old paintings by removing layers of their original paint and adding new layers of imagery from Rey's travels. The series had an introspective element as while painting, Rey would wonder about the artists' lives, how the paintings ended up being discarded, and how by working on the paintings, he felt connected to those artists.

Cuban Portraits Series (1998-1999)

Rey described the inspiration behind the series as the Mexican portrait painter Hermenegildo Bustos (1832 – 1907) as Bustos portraits visually cataloged an ethnic group people in a moment of their history. Rey's series depicts both Cubans living in Cuba and Cubans living in the United States with an emphasis on character, social and economic class, and ethnic identity.

Las Balsas (The Rafts) Series (1995-1999)

Researching Cuban archives in a library in Key West, FL, led Rey to discover the mission of the Cuban Refugee Center on Stock Island. When Cuban immigrants would arrive to the Florida Keys on rafts, the center would provide temporary housing, medical help, food, and connected immigrants to relatives living in America. The center displayed various rafts and crafts refugees used for the 90-mile crossing. Because Rey had several relatives who traveled to America on rafts and even a grandmother who did not survive the passage, Rey created the series in hopes to draw viewers in to explore the rafts and to ponder what the journey for Cuban refugees must have been like. The success of the persons traveling on the rafts is left ambiguous. Rey hoped for the raft imagery to metaphorically become quiet but strong reminders of human tragedies and triumphs.

Appropriated Memories Series (1996-1997)

As Jorge J.E. gracia highlights in his essay "The Construction of Identity in Art: Alberto Rey's Journey," for the previous thirteen years, Rey's work was geared towards reclaiming his Cuban heritage. Increasingly during that period in his life, he had growing concerns about a lack of connection to his surroundings in America. In an effort to analyze what he valued, he painted beloved memories including moments with his family, cultural religions symbols, and imagery from his childhood in a small rural coal-mining town in Pennsylvania. Since then, his work has tried to mend the spirituality of his Cuban culture with seeking some sense of spirituality in his everyday life. The Appropriated Memories Series aim to capture the fulfillment of researching, finding, and painting images of what he believed were a lost time. Altogether, the images are an abstracted recollection, reminiscences, and interpretations of his memory of Cuba.

Icon Series (1993-1995)

Lynette M.F. Bosch described how Rey's desire to reconnect to his Cuban identity as an American with no actual memories of his country, shifted his work to depict objects and experiences that meant “Cuba” to him as they were described in stories told by his relatives. Rey painted Cuban food on a large-scale, turning the dishes into monuments and elevating their status from everyday cuisine to iconicized cultural symbols as seen in “Ancel Guava Paste” (Completed 1994), collected into the Museum of Art in Fort Lauderdale, FL.”

Madonnas of Western New York Series(1991-1993)

As Rey lived with his wife in Fredonia, NY they began exploring the cultural icons of Chautauqua County. He built small wooden boxes and painted well-known symbols of the area like the Niagara Mohawk Power Plant (Now called NRG) as seen in the work “Niagara Mohawk: Dunkirk, New York” (1992). The construction of the boxes and the transformation of ordinary sights likened to altars in religious customs, connecting Rey's new home to his Cuban heritage and traditions.

This series is described as being a major change in Rey's stylistic approach from his previous abstract series. As it became necessary for the audience to be able to see and recognize these Western New York icons in order to understand their significance, Rey began painting more representationally. So while his abstract work relied more on producing emotion through minimalist forms, his new work connected realistic, visceral imagery to his messages.

Binary Forms Series (1998-1992)

His marriage in 1989 reinvigorated his interest in depicting religion and its influence on marriage. The work uses symbols to express the sometimes at-odds concepts of marriage, religion, memory, spirituality, and eroticism. Specifically, overlapping forms stood in for themes of marriage and memory, black lace invoked religion and eroticism, and binary forms recalled marriage, while gold linked to both marriage and religion.

Black Lace Series and Nuptial Series (1987-1989)

As overviewed by Lynette M.F. Bosch, Rey's Black Lace Series spurred from fascination of Catholic rituals, sainthood, and the artist's exposure to Santeria, a Cuban synthesis of Catholic and African religions. The duality of personal items such as veils worn by women for modesty in church can also be seen as seductive in other contexts. The veil, and the lace often featured on veils, became motifs in this series seen especially in the work “Fertility” (1989). In the work “Postnuptial Gold: Time” (Completed 1991, Albright-Knox Art Gallery permanent collection) the color gold symbolizes the metal's preciousness and references the Catholic Church's rites of marriage.

Autogeographical Series and Floating Series ( 1985-1987)

The Autogeographical Series drew from Rey's experiences in graduate school and often directly represented the places he lived in. An example from this body of work is “Holy Angels Church and Chair” which was collected by the Burchfield-Penney Arts Center in 1987. The Floating Series took a more surreal approach to the same topic by incorporating his own dream language and depicted these land and cityscapes from a bird's-eye-view perspective. The series aims to depict the more transitory and non-permanent aspects of memory and dreaming. An example from this series is “Transitions” (completed 1988) and was collected into the Castellani Art Museum of Niagara University in Buffalo, NY.

Documentaries 
"BAGMATI  (Biological Regionalism: Bagmati River, Kathmandu Valley, Nepal)", Color Video, 32:14 run-time, 2016–2017. This video documents the Bagmati River Art Project and includes interviews with health professionals, community members, and lawmakers. Included are traditional Nepalese folk songs and a commissioned song about the river. Screened 2017 at the Open Village Festival, Brussels, Belgium and in 2016 at the Siddhartha Gallery, in Kathmandu, Nepal.

"Biological Regionalism: Atlantic Cod," black and white video, 10:00 run-time, 2007. This video was created for a residency at the Peabody Essex Museum in Salem, MA. The artist explores a brief history of the Atlantic cod and its influence on the economy of New England. It screened in 2007 at the Peabody Essex Museum in Salem, MA.

The 2006 black and white video “Primal Connections” (18:40 run-time) investigates how people in the modern age make meaningful connections to nature. This video was screened and acquired into the permanent collection of the MEIAC in Spain in 2013. It screened in 2013 at the Extremeño e Iberoamericano de Arte Contemporáneo (Extremaduran and Latin American Museum of Contemporary Art), in 2008 at Washington and Lee University, and in 2006 at the Rochester Contemporary Gallery.

The 2005 black and white video “An Unkept Promise” (19:00 run-time) details the emotional journey of Rey taking his first return trip to his home country of Cuba 36 years after emigrating with his family as a child. These aforementioned videos were all screened and acquired into the permanent collection of the MEIAC in 2013. This video was screened at many different venues and was acquired into the permanent collection of the MEIAC in Spain in 2013.

In 2004, the black and white video “Waters off of Caribarien, Cuba '' (60:00 run-time) depicting the waters surrounding a small island where many Cubans traveled by raft through the Gulf Stream to Florida, USA, was inducted into the permanent collection of the Burchfield Penney Art Center and later in 2013, it was both screened and acquired by the MEIAC. During the same exhibition the MEIAC also screened and acquired the 180-degree view of a stream where steel-head migrate called “Biological Regionalism: Reiter Creek, Sheridan, New York, USA” (Color Videos, five 1:30 run-time videos). It screened in 2017, 2013, and 2005 at the Burchfield Penney Art Center and the Lucille Ball Desi Arnaz Museum, in 2015 at Canisius College, in 2013 at Extremeño e Iberoamericano de Arte Contemporáneo, in 2013 at the Masur Museum, in 2010 at the Memorial Art Gallery, in 2010 at University of Buffalo, in 2008 at Mary Baldwin College, Staunton, VA, in 2008 at Washington and Lee University, in 2007 at Cleveland Institute of Art, in 2007 at the Chautauqua Institution, and in 2005 at the DeadCenter Film Festival, Oklahoma City, OK.

The 2001 black and white 16mm film “Seeing the Dark” (6:30 run-time) encapsulates Rey's return trip to Cuba and signaled a change in viewpoint to cease depicting his home country in nostalgic methods as described by Lynette M.F. Bosch and art historian Mark Denaci in their collection of essays about Rey's work entitled "“Life Streams – Albert Rey’s Cuban and American Art”." It was screened in 2015 at Canisius College, 2013 at Extremeño e Iberoamericano de Arte Contemporáneo (Extremaduran and Latin American Museum of Contemporary Art), 2013 at the Burchfield Penney Art Center, 2013 at Masur Museum, 2010 at Memorial Art Gallery, 2010 at the University of Buffalo, 2008 at Mary Baldwin College, 2008 at Washington and Lee University, 2007 at the Chautauqua Institution, 2007 at the Cleveland Institute of Art, 2001 at the Marvel Theater at the State University of New York at Fredonia.

Other Videos 
2014

The following two videos were created for a solo exhibition at the Burchfield Penney Art Center in 2014. "Biological Regionalism: Tunnel, Scajaquada Creek, Erie County, New York, USA," Color Video, 4:25 run-time. This video documents the tunnel that was built to bury the polluted Scajaquada Creek under the city of Buffalo. "Biological Regionalism: Leech, Scajaquada Creek, Erie County, New York, USA," Color Video, 3:10 run-time. This video documents a leech swimming the polluted waters in a suburb of Buffalo, NY.

2013

"Biological Regionalism: Reiter Creek, Sheridan, New York, USA," Color Video, five 1:30 videos. These are site-specific video installations presenting a 180-degree view of a steelhead migration site. The MEIAC (Museo Extremeño e Iberoamericano de Arte Contemporáneo) in Badajoz, Spain, hosted the exhibition “Biological Regionalism”, a retrospective of Rey's videography, in 2013. The museum screened more than ten of Rey's videos dating from 2001-2012 documenting environments of site-specific places and their impact on a culture's identity.  During the exhibition, the MEIAC acquired several of Rey's films into their permanent collection including “Waters off of Caribarien, Cuba,” “Seeing the Dark,” “Primal Connections,” “An Unkept Promise” and more videos from the Biological Regionalism series entitled “Reiter Creek, Sheridan, New York, USA” and “Horseshoe Lake, Monroe, Louisiana, USA.” The Masur Museum and the MEIAC ( (Museo Extremeño e Iberoamericano de Arte Contemporáneo) in Badajoz, Spain also collected “Biological Regionalism: Black Bayou, Monroe, Louisiana, USA” (Color Video, 3:15 run-time). The same video was screened at the Masur Museum and the MEIAC during a retrospective of Rey's videography held in 2013.

2010

"Biological Regionalism: Lower Falls, Genesee River, Rochester, New York, USA," Color Video, 1:36:30 run-time. This video and two 8-foot paintings were created and screened as part of as a site-specific installation for the Fourth Rochester Biennial at the Memorial Art Gallery, Rochester, NY. The work explored the migratory pattern of steelhead trout and historical depictions of the Genesee River.

"Biological Regionalism: Ellicott Creek, Amherst, New York, USA: III," Color Video, 1:30:12 run-time, 2009," "Biological Regionalism: Ellicott Creek, Amherst, New York, USA: II," Color Video, 1:36:30 run-time, 2010, and "Biological Regionalism: Ellicott Creek, Amherst, New York, USA: I," Color Video, 1:30:34 run-time, 2010," were underwater videos created for a site-specific installation for the Lightwell Gallery at the University of Buffalo, NY exploring the migratory pattern of largemouth bass and the history Ellicott Creek. These videos were screened 2013 at Extremeño e Iberoamericano de Arte Contemporáneo (Extremaduran and Latin American Museum of Contemporary Art), and in 2008 at the Lightwell Gallery Center.

2008

"Biological Regionalism: Big Mary’s Creek, Vesuvius, VA, May 8th," Color Video, 5:30 run-time, This video was created as part of a residency at Washington and Lee University, Lexington, VA, exploring one of the state's indigenous fish species (brook trout) and the local environment. The video screened in 2013 at Extremeño e Iberoamericano de Arte Contemporáneo (Extremaduran and Latin American Museum of Contemporary Art), and in 2008 at the Washington and Lee University, Lexington, VA.

2007

"Biological Regionalism: Atlantic Cod," Black and white video, 10:00. The video was created for a residency at the Peabody Essex Museum in Salem, MA. The artist explores a brief history of the Atlantic cod and its influence on the economy of New England. It screened in 2007 at the Peabody Essex Museum.

2005

"Los Jardines de la Reina (The Queen’s Gardens), Cuba, July 10th, 2004," Color Video, 5:40, was collected in 2005 by the Art Museum of University of Virginia. It screened in 2013 at the Extremeño e Iberoamericano de Arte  Contemporáneo, in 2008 at Washington and Lee University and in 2005 at El Museo Francisco Oller y Diego Rivera in Buffalo, NY.

Bibliography 

 
 
 
 "Spirituality of Nature," Buffalo Spree, April, Buffalo, NY.(2017)  
 
 
 "Fly Fishing in Iceland," Buffalo Spree, October, Buffalo, NY.(2015)
 "Winter Fly Fishing," Buffalo Spree, December, Buffalo, NY.(2015)
 
 
 
 "Guggenheim Bilbao in Spain," Buffalo Spree, April, Buffalo, NY.(2008)
 "Fly fishing Western New York," Buffalo Spree, May, Buffalo, NY.(2008)

Publications about the Artist 

"The Search for Home: From Exile to Preservationist," Lynette M.F. Bosch, Art Museum of the Americas, Washington, D.C.(2021)

"The Cuban-American Exile Vanguardia: Toward a Theory of Cuban-American Art," Lynette M.F. Bosch, 187–218, color plate 43, in Picturing Cuba: Art, Culture, and Identity on the Island and in the Diaspora, editor, Jorge Duany, University of Florida Press, Gainesville, FL.(2019)

“Seeing in the Dark: The Aesthetics of Disappearance and Remembrance in the Work of Alberto Rey," Stephanie Lewthwaite, Journal of American Studies, Cambridge University Press, Cambridge, United Kingdom.(2016)

“Life Streams – Albert Rey’s Cuban and American Art”, Lynette Bosch and  Mark Denaci. State University of New York Press, Albany, NY.(2014)

"Alberto Rey’s Balsa Series in the Cuban American Imagination," Isabel Alvarez-Borland, CrossWorks, College of the Holy Cross, Worcester, MA.(2014)

“Painting Borges: Philosophy Interpreting Art Interpreting Literature”, Jorge J. E. Gracia, State University of New York Press, Albany, NY.(2012)

“Drawing (on) Borges,” The New Centennial Review, Volume 11, Number 1, Spring 2011, Michigan State University Press, East Lansing Michigan, MI.(2011)

“Cuban-American Literature and Art: Negotiating Identities,” Isabel Borland and Lynette Bosch, State University of New York Press, Albany, NY.(2009)

“Memories of Others: Ana Mendez and Alberto Rey,” Dr. Isabel Alvarez-Borland, Review: Literature and Arts of the Americas, Volume 42, Issue 1, 2009, Americas Society / Routledge, Abington, Oxfordshire, UK.(2009)

“Identity, Memory, and Diaspora: Voices of Cuban-American Artists, Writers, and Philosophers,”Jorge J. E. Gracia, Lynette Bosch, and Isabel Alvarez Borland, ed. State University of New York Press, Albany, NY.(2008)

“Cuban-American Art in Miami,” Lynnette Bosch, Lund Humphries, Ashgate Publishing, Hampshire, UK.(2004)

“Memoria: Artes Visuales del Siglo XX” (Memory: Visual Artists of the 20th Century), Maria Cristina Vives Gutierrez, California/International Arts Foundation, Los Angeles, CA.(2002)

“ReMembering Cuba: Legacy of a Diaspora,” Herrera, Andrea, Austin: University of Texas Press, Austin, TX.(2001)

“New American Painting,” Open Studios Press, Needham, MA, curated by Elisabeth Sussman, Head Curator of the Whitney Museum, NY.

Honors and awards
Rey has received the following honors and awards:

 Finalist Orvis Guide Freshwater Guide of the Year, Sunderland, Vermont(2020)
 Visiting Artist at the Masur Museum, Monroe, LA(2012)
 Distinguished Alumni Award at the Indiana University of Pennsylvania, Indiana, PA(2008)
 Visiting Artist Residency at Peabody Essex Museum, Salem, MA(2008)
 State University of New York Distinguished Professor for Research and Creativity, the University's highest honor, Albany, NY(2007)
 State University of New York Chancellor's Research Recognition Award, Albany, NY(2005)
 State University of New York Chancellor's Award for Excellence in Scholarship and Creative Activity, Albany, NY(2003)
 Kasling Lecturer Award for distinguished scholarly and creative activity as senior faculty member, State University of New York at Fredonia, NY(2001)
 William T. and Charlotte N. Hagan Young Scholar/Artist Award. This award recognizes an individual who has made out- standing recent achievements in research or creativity State University of New York at Fredonia, Fredonia, NY(1994)
 Minority Visiting Scholars Award, Central Missouri State University, Warrensburg, MO(1994)

References 

Living people
People from Havana
University at Buffalo alumni
1960 births